Cream Box (クリームボックス) is a Japanese sweet from Kōriyama, Fukushima.

Store 

 Romio
 Otomo

See also 
 Mamador
 Usukawa Manju

Japanese confectionery
Kōriyama